Siu Hang Tsuen is a village in Tuen Mun District, Hong Kong.

Administration
Siu Hang Tsuen is a recognized village under the New Territories Small House Policy. It is one of the 36 villages represented within the Tuen Mun Rural Committee. For electoral purposes, Siu Hang Tsuen is part of the Po Tin constituency.

History
Archaeological deposits in Siu Hang Tsuen and Kei Lun Wai were discovered in 1997 during a survey carried out by a team from Zhongshan University. The findings indicated occupation of the area from the Song, Ming and Qing periods.

Features
The Hong Kong Fengshan Temple is located in Siu Hang Tsuen.

See also
 Po Tong Ha, a village located directly north of Siu Hang Tsuen

References

External links
 Delineation of area of existing village Siu Hang Tsuen (Tuen Mun) for election of resident representative (2019 to 2022)

Villages in Tuen Mun District, Hong Kong